Dicte may refer to:

 Dicte or Diktynna, alternative names for Britomartis, the Minoan goddess of mountains and hunting
 Dicte (moth), fairy longhorn moth genus
 Dicte (musician), Danish musician and songwriter
 Dicte (TV series), a Danish TV series starring Iben Hjejle
 Dikti or Dicte, a mountain in Crete